FLOTUS ("FLOTUS", an abbreviation for "For Love Often Turns Us Still") is the twelfth studio album by American band Lambchop, released on November 4, 2016. It marked a significant stylistic departure for the group into more electronic-influenced territory, as heard by the instrumental emphasis on synthesizers and the Auto-Tune effects applied to singer-songwriter Kurt Wagner's voice.

Accolades

Track listing 
 "In Care of 8675309" (Kurt Wagner) – 11:51
 "Directions to the Can" (Ira Kaplan, Wagner) – 3:32
 "FLOTUS" (Wagner) – 3:29
 "JFK" (Wagner) – 5:32
 "Howe" (Wagner) – 4:05
 "Old Masters" (Wagner) – 4:43
 "Relatives #2" (Wagner) – 5:25
 "Harbor Country" (Wagner) – 3:26
 "Writer" (Wagner) – 3:41
 "NIV" (Wagner) – 4:35
 "The Hustle" (Ryan Norris, Wagner) – 18:12

Personnel 
Adapted from AllMusic.
 Sean R. Badum – assistant
 Alicia Bognanno – background vocals
 Tony Crow – piano,
 Jeremy Ferguson – engineer, mixing engineer, producer
 Matt Glassmeyer – clarinet, contra-alto clarinet, cornet, horn arrangements, tenor saxophone
 Scott Martin – drum Programming, drums
 Ryan Norris – additional production, Drum programming, editing, guitar, Moog synthesizer, organ, piano, synthesizer
 Matt Swanson – bass
 Kurt Wagner – Composer, editing, Group Member, guitar, paintings, producer, vocals

Charts

References 

2016 albums
Lambchop (band) albums
City Slang albums
Merge Records albums